Louis-Michel Nourry (5 April 1946 – 14 September 2022) was a French historian who specialized in the history of landscaping and gardening. He was an honorary professor of the Écoles nationales supérieures d'architecture.

Publications
Le Thabor (1990)
Le jardin du Luxembourg (1991)
Lyon, le Parc de la Tête d'Or (1992)
Les Jardins publics en province : Espaces et politique au XIXe siècle (1995)
La Bretagne des jardins (1997)
Les jardins publics en France (1997)
Le Thabor : Rennes (2002)
Jardin médiéval (2002)
Les jardins de Villandry (2002)
Paysages de Rennes : Nature et espaces publics (2005)
Vents, Invention et Évolution des Formes (2008)
Le Thabor - Renaissance d'un patrimoine rennais (2013)
Kerguéhennec - architecture et paysage(s) (2016)

Distinctions
Gold Medal of the Ligue musicale Maine-Anjou (1977)
Knight of the Ordre des Palmes académiques (1990)
Prix des écrivains de l'Ouest (1991)

References

1946 births
2022 deaths
20th-century French historians
21st-century French historians
People from Fougères
Chevaliers of the Ordre des Palmes Académiques